Deltaspis is a genus of longhorn beetle in the subfamily Cerambycinae, containing the following species:

 Deltaspis alutacea Bates, 1885
 Deltaspis auromarginata Audinet-Serville, 1834
 Deltaspis cruentus (LeConte, 1862)
 Deltaspis cyanipes Bates, 1885
 Deltaspis disparilis Bates, 1891
 Deltaspis ivae Beierl & Barchet-Beierl, 1999
 Deltaspis marginella Bates, 1891
 Deltaspis moesta Bates, 1885
 Deltaspis nigripennis Bates, 1880
 Deltaspis rubens Bates, 1885
 Deltaspis rubriventris Bates, 1880
 Deltaspis rufostigma Bates, 1892
 Deltaspis subopaca Chemsak & Linsley, 1982
 Deltaspis thoracica White, 1853
 Deltaspis tumacacorii (Knull, 1944)
 Deltaspis variabilis Bates, 1891

References

 
Trachyderini
Cerambycidae genera